Crawford Lake is a lake in the Moose River drainage basin in Sudbury District, Ontario, Canada.

The primary inflow is an unnamed creek from Hanrahan Lake at the west. The primary outflow, at the east, is the Crawford River, which flows via the Nat River, Groundhog River, Mattagami River and Moose River to James Bay.

References

Lakes of Sudbury District